Callidula jucunda is a moth of the  family Callidulidae. It is endemic to Sundaland,  a biogeographical region of Southeastern Asia.

References

Callidulidae
Moths described in 1874